It's the Old Army Game is a 1926 American silent comedy film starring W. C. Fields and Louise Brooks. The film was directed by Eddie Sutherland and co-stars Sutherland's aunt, the stage actress Blanche Ring in one of her few silent film appearances. The film is based on the revue The Comic Supplement by Joseph P. McEvoy and Fields, and included several skits from Fields' stage plays. The "army game" in the title is in reference to a shell game, a con-trick which Fields’ character observes being played. "It's the old army game," he says, sagely.

Large sections of the film, including the "picnic" and "sleeping on the porch" scenes; were incorporated into Fields' classic talkie film It's a Gift (1934)

Synopsis  

Elmer Prettywillie is a small town druggist/general store owner whose customers are eccentric at best and rude and demanding at worst.  They include a man who wants "a nice, clean two-cent stamp" from the center of a  massive sheet of them.

Prettywillie' sole joy is his pretty clerk , but not her homely maiden aunt, who has an unrequited crush on him.
Attempting to sleep on an outdoor back porch, Prettywillie is disturbed by a series of noisy peddlers, including a surly ice man who insists Prettywillie heft his own heavy, rapidly melting block of ice. A neighbor then insists Prettywillie watch her bratty baby; whom Prettywillie cheerfully attempts to smother to stop its crying. The baby eventually gets hold of a large mallet and knows exactly what to do with it. Prettywillie ends up destroying the back porch when he accidentally discharges a shotgun.

Later, Prettywillie and family stage a picnic on the front lawn of a private estate, and order the owner of the house to clean up their unholy, paper-strewn mess.

Real estate hustler George Parker arrives in town and becomes smitten with Marshall. Marshall talks Prettywillie into letting Parker sell real estate out of the store. When New York City police arrive and take Parker away in connection with a previous "bad deal", Prettywillie is left to face the wrath of the investors.

Prettywillie makes a quick trip to New York City, hoping to locate Parker. Not used to city traffic, he drives the wrong way on a one-way street and has various parts of his car sheared off. He hires a mule to pull the car. The mule refuses to budge. Prettywillie tries to give the mule a hot foot,and only succeeds in burning up what's left of the car.

Returning home in defeat, Prettywillie gives himself up at the police station, but he learns a developer has re-bought the lots at a high price, enriching the town and making him a hero. When the maiden aunt arrives, Prettywillie locks her in a cell and makes a hasty retreat. Prettywillie and Parker meanwhile, have eloped.

Cast
W. C. Fields as Elmer Prettywillie
Louise Brooks as Mildred Marshall
Blanche Ring as Tessie Overholt
William Gaxton as George Parker
Mary Foy as Sarah Pancoast
Mickey Bennett as Mickey
Josephine Dunn as Society Bather
Jack Luden as Society Bather
George Currie as Artist
Elise Cavanna as Nearsighted woman (uncredited)
John Merton as Fireman (uncredited)
Rose Elliott (uncredited)

Production
The film was shot mainly at Paramount's Astoria Studios facility in Astoria, Queens and in Manhattan, and is preserved complete in the Library of Congress. A few outdoor scenes were filmed in Ocala, Florida and Palm Beach, Florida.

A 2018 DVD release, 75 minutes long, contains a newly written organ music score played by noted silent film restorist Ben Model.

References

External links 
 
It's the Old Army Game at SilentEra
 

1920s American films
1926 comedy films
American black-and-white films
American silent feature films
Famous Players-Lasky films
Films directed by A. Edward Sutherland
Films shot in Florida
Films shot in New York City
Paramount Pictures films
Silent American comedy films